is a Japanese manga by Jiro Taniguchi. It was adapted into a live-action French-Belgian film in 2010.

Plot
Middle-aged salaryman Hiroshi Nakahara accidentally takes a train ride back to his old hometown to visit his mother's grave. Then, for reasons he cannot explain, Hiroshi is transported over 30 years into the past, reacquainting himself with the family he has since lost and the individual memories he has since forgotten.

See also
 17 Again (2009 film)
 Again!! (2011 manga)
 Erased (2012 manga)
 ReLIFE (2013 manga)
Tokyo Revengers

References

External links
 
 

Gekiga
Jiro Taniguchi
Live-action films based on manga
Manga adapted into films
Seinen manga
Shogakukan manga
Shogakukan franchises